Brloh is a municipality and village in Český Krumlov District in the South Bohemian Region of the Czech Republic. It has about 1,100 inhabitants.

Administrative parts
Villages of Janské Údolí, Jaronín, Kovářov, Rojšín, Rychtářov and Sedm Chalup are administrative parts of Brloh.

References

Villages in Český Krumlov District